Events in the year 1936 in Turkey.

Parliament
 5th Parliament of Turkey

Incumbents
President – Kemal Atatürk
Prime Minister – İsmet İnönü

Ruling party and the main opposition
 Ruling party – Republican People's Party (CHP)

Cabinet
8th government of Turkey

Events
6 May: First Conservatoire was founded
29 May: Turkish flag was legally defined
 20 July: Montreux Convention signed.
 8 September: Radio Broadcasting was nationalized

Births
25 January – Onat Kutlar, writer
31 January – Can Bartu, footballer
1 February – Tuncel Kurtiz, actor
2 February – Metin Oktay, footballer
15 March – Göksel Arsoy, actor
22 March – Erol Büyükburç, singer
15 April – Aydın Doğan, business man, newspaper owner
18 May – Türker İnanoğlu, film producer
28 June – Belgin Doruk, actress
8 August – Çolpan İlhan, actress
24 September, İnal Batu, diplomat, politician
27 September – Şeref Has, footballer
8 November – Yılmaz Büyükerşen, academic, mayor of Eskişehir

Death
13 July – Fatma Aliye Topuz (born in 1862), one of the earliest female novelists
26 October – Şükrü Naili Gökberk (born in 1876), retired general
27 December – Mehmet Akif Ersoy (born in 1873), poet of the national anthem

Gallery

See also
Turkey at the 1936 Summer Olympics
Turkey at the 1936 Winter Olympics

References

 
Years of the 20th century in Turkey
Turkey
Turkey
Turkey